Viento es la dicha de amor is a 1743 zarzuela by José de Nebra, premiered in Madrid.

Recording
 Viento es la dicha de amor - Limoges Baroque Ensemble Christophe Coin 2CD

References

1743 operas
Zarzuelas
Spanish-language operas
Baroque compositions
Operas